Romania participated in the 2015 European Games, in Baku, Azerbaijan from 12 to 28 June 2015.

Medalists

Updated to 25 June 2015 at 19:30 (GMT+3).

Archery

Fencing

Eleven Romanian fencers qualified in five out of six individual events. Accompanying coaches are Mihai Covaliu for sabre, Petre Ducu for foil and Gheorghe Epurescu for épée.

Men

Women

Gymnastics

Aerobic
Romania has a total of six athletes after the performance at the 2013 Aerobic Gymnastics European Championships. One gymnast from pairs must compete in the group making the total athletes to 6.
 Pairs – 1 pair of 2 athletes
 Groups – 1 team of 5 athletes

Artistic
Women's – 3 quota places

Rhythmic
Romania has qualified one athlete after the performance at the 2013 Rhythmic Gymnastics European Championships.
 Individual – 1 quota place

Triathlon

Men's – Ciprian Bălănescu
Women's – Antoanela Manac

References

Nations at the 2015 European Games
European Games
2015